Tripotamos (before 1928: Πετοράκι - Petoraki; Macedonian/Bulgarian: Петорак, Petorak) is a village in Florina regional unit, Western Macedonia, Greece. 

The Greek census (1920) recorded 135 people in the village. Following the Greek-Turkish population exchange, in 1926 within Petoraki there were 27 refugee families from the Caucasus and 3 from an unidentified location. The Greek census (1928) recorded 319 village inhabitants. There were 34 refugee families (140 people) in 1928. 

Tripotamos had 550 inhabitants in 1981. In fieldwork done by Riki Van Boeschoten in late 1993, Tripotamos was populated by Slavophones, a Greek population descended from Anatolian Greek refugees who arrived during the population exchange, and Arvanites. The Macedonian language was used by people of all ages, both in public and private settings, and as the main language for interpersonal relationships. Some elderly villagers had little knowledge of Greek. Pontic Greek was spoken in the village by people over 30 in public and private settings. Children understood the language, but mostly did not use it. Arvanitika (close to Albanian) was spoken by people over 60, mainly in private.

References

Populated places in Florina (regional unit)
Albanian communities in Greece